Shah (Old Persian XšāyaΘiya) is the Persian word for "King", mainly used in Iran/Persia.

Shah may also refer to:

Arts and media 
 Shah (film), a 2015 Pakistani biopic about Olympian boxer Syed Hussain Shah
 The Shah (book), a 2011 biography of the last Shah of Iran, by Abbas Milani
 Shah of Shahs (book), a 1982 book by Ryszard Kapuściński

People 
 Shah (surname), a list of people with the surname that is common in India and Pakistan
 Shah Jalal (1271–1346), Sufi Muslim figure in Bengal
 Shah Rukh Khan (born 1965), Indian Bollywood actor
 Raline Shah (born 1985), Indonesian actress

Geographic places
Shah, Ras al-Khaimah, a settlement in Ras al-Khaimah
Shah, Fars, a village in Fars Province, Iran

Other uses
 Shah (caste), a Hindu caste in India
 Shah dynasty, a ruling dynasty of the Gorkha Kingdom until 1768 AD and Nepal until 2008 AD
 Ukrainian shah, a historical currency of Ukraine
 Dirac comb distribution, also called Shah function

See also
 Iranian rial, with historical variety named shahi or chahi
 Sha (disambiguation)
 Shaa (disambiguation)
 Shahanshah (disambiguation)
 Kabul Shahi (disambiguation)
 List of monarchs of Persia (the Shahs)